Chmeľnica is a village and municipality in Stará Ľubovňa District in the Prešov Region of northern Slovakia. The village is traditionally inhabited by Carpathian Germans.

History
The village was established in 1315 by German settlers. Another 40 families of ethnic Germans from Silesia arrived here in 1787. The local German-speaking population was not expelled after World War II, but from 1946 until the end of the communist regime, speaking German was outlawed.
The survival of German in the village sparked interest in German and Austrian media.

Geography
The municipality lies at an altitude of 528 metres (~1750 feet) and covers an area of 12.643 km². It has a population of about 918 people.

Genealogical resources

The records for genealogical research are available at the state archive "Statny Archiv in Levoca, Slovakia"

 Roman Catholic church records (births/marriages/deaths): 1779-1914 (parish A)

See also
 List of municipalities and towns in Slovakia

References

External links
 https://web.archive.org/web/20071116010355/http://www.statistics.sk/mosmis/eng/run.html
 Surnames of living people in Chmelnica

Villages and municipalities in Stará Ľubovňa District